Mortal Sin is a 1970 Brazilian drama film directed by Miguel Faria Jr. The film was selected as the Brazilian entry for the Best Foreign Language Film at the 43rd Academy Awards, but was not accepted as a nominee.

Cast
 Fernanda Montenegro as Fernanda
 José Lewgoy as José
 Renato Machado as Renato
 Anecy Rocha as Anecy
 Rejane Medeiros as Rejane
 Suzana de Moraes as Suzana
 Marina Montini
 Ivan Pontes

See also
 List of submissions to the 43rd Academy Awards for Best Foreign Language Film
 List of Brazilian submissions for the Academy Award for Best Foreign Language Film

References

External links
 

1970 films
1970 drama films
1970s Portuguese-language films
Brazilian drama films
Films directed by Miguel Faria Jr.